Haracca is a genus of parasitic flies in the family Tachinidae.

Species
Haracca parnassiina Richter, 1994

Distribution
Uzbekistan.

References

Diptera of Asia
Endemic fauna of Uzbekistan
Dexiinae
Tachinidae genera
Monotypic Brachycera genera